Ramjiwala is a small village in the tehsil of Raisingh Nagar, Ganganagar District, in the Indian state of Rajasthan.

References 

Villages in Sri Ganganagar district